John Smith (born 1898) was a Scottish footballer, who played for Ayr United, Middlesbrough, Cardiff City, Distillery and Scotland; in his sole international appearance in 1924, he was alongside Ayr United teammate Philip McCloy in the Scottish defence against England at Wembley, the match ending in a draw.

References

Sources

External links
London Hearts profile (Scotland)
London Hearts profile (Scottish League)

1898 births
Date of birth missing
Year of death missing
Scottish footballers
Association football fullbacks
Scotland international footballers
Ayr United F.C. players
Middlesbrough F.C. players
Cardiff City F.C. players
Lisburn Distillery F.C. players
Scottish Football League players
Scottish Football League representative players
English Football League players
Place of birth missing